This is a list of Yugoslav Cup winning football managers. 

Tomislav Ivić won the tournament on four occasions, leading Hajduk Split to success in  the 1972, 1973, 1974, 1976 Finals; two other managers have won the title on three occasions.

None of the managers have won the title with two different sides, but Illés Spitz, Ivan Jazbinšek, Josip Duvančić and Milovan Ćirić have appeared in the finals leading two different sides.

Winning managers

By individual

References

Managers
Yugoslav Cup
Yugoslav Cup winners